Ivrea railway station is the train station serving the town and comune of Ivrea, in the Piedmont region, northwestern Italy. It is the junction of the Chivasso–Aosta railway.

The station is currently managed by Rete Ferroviaria Italiana (RFI). Train services are operated by Trenitalia.  Each of these companies is a subsidiary of Ferrovie dello Stato (FS), Italy's state-owned rail company.

History
The station was opened on 5 November 1858, upon the inauguration the second part of the Chivasso–Ivrea–Aosta railway, from Caluso to Ivrea.

Features
Four tracks, three of which are equipped with platforms, overpass the station.

Regional links
The station is served by the following service:

Express services (Regionale Veloce) Turin - Chivasso – Ivrea – Aosta
Regional services (Treno regionale) Novara - Chivasso - Ivrea
Regional services (Treno regionale) Chivasso - Ivrea
Regional services (Treno regionale) Ivrea - Aosta

See also

 History of rail transport in Italy
 List of railway stations in Piedmont
 Rail transport in Italy
 Railway stations in Italy

References

External links

Buildings and structures in Ivrea
Railway stations in the Metropolitan City of Turin
Railway stations opened in 1858